The Olympic Apartment Building is a building located in northwest Portland, Oregon listed on the National Register of Historic Places.

See also
 National Register of Historic Places listings in Northwest Portland, Oregon

References

1928 establishments in Oregon
Apartment buildings on the National Register of Historic Places in Portland, Oregon
Northwest Portland, Oregon
Residential buildings completed in 1928
Spanish Revival architecture in Oregon